Tivoli is a census-designated place and unincorporated community in Refugio County, Texas, United States. It takes its name from the town of Tivoli in the Lazio region of central Italy. This was a new CDP for the 2010 census with a population of 479.

Geography
Tivoli is located at  (28.460839, -96.891470).

Education
The Austwell-Tivoli Independent School District serves area students and home to the Austwell-Tivoli High School Redfish.

References

External links
 

Census-designated places in Refugio County, Texas
Unincorporated communities in Texas
Census-designated places in Texas